Daisuke Ebisawa (born 26 May 1978) is a Japanese biathlete. He competed in the men's sprint event at the 2006 Winter Olympics.

References

1978 births
Living people
Japanese male biathletes
Olympic biathletes of Japan
Biathletes at the 2006 Winter Olympics
Sportspeople from Aomori Prefecture